Hamer (said Hay-mer) is an English and Dutch surname. Hamer is Dutch and Middle English for "hammer", and often is a metonymic occupational name, e.g. referring to a smith. In English the name could also be toponymic, suggesting an origin in Hamer, Lancashire. 

People with this surname include:

 Paul Hamer (born 1962), American artist and entrepreneur
 Alain Hamer (born 1965), Luxembourgian football referee
 Arnold Hamer (1916–1993), English cricketer
 Ben Hamer (born 1987), English footballer with Charlton Athletic
 Bent Hamer (born 1956), Norwegian film director
 Colin Hamer (born 1988), Sint Maarten cricketer
 Dale Hamer (born 1930s), American football official 
 David Hamer (1923–2002), Australian politician and navy officer
 David Hamer (footballer) (born 1866), Welsh footballer with Southampton F.C.
 Dean Hamer (born 1951), American geneticist, author, and filmmaker
 Elizabeth Hamer Kegan (1912–1979), American archivist and librarian
 Elsie Hamer Wilkie (1922–1995), New Zealand lawn bowls player
 Fannie Lou Hamer (1917–1977), American civil rights leader 
 Ferdinand Hamer (1840–1900), Dutch Catholic missionary and bishop in China
 Forrest Hamer (born 1956), American poet, psychologist, and psychoanalyst
Frances Mary Hamer (1894–1980), British chemist
 Frank Hamer (1884–1955), Texas Ranger
 Frank Hamer (British Army officer) (1919–2009), World War II officer
 Fritz Hamer (1912–2004), German botanist
 Gabriel Hamer-Webb (born 2000), English rugby union player
 Garry Hamer (born 1943), Australian rules footballer
 Gerald Hamer (1886–1972), British film actor
 Gladys Hamer (1884–1967), British stage and film actress
 Graham Hamer (born 1936), New Zealand rugby coach
 Gustavo Hamer (born 1996), Dutch Brazilian football midfielder
 Harry Spencer Hamer (1863–1913), English football manager
 Hubert Hamer (born c. 1959), American agricultural scientist and administrator
 Ian Hamer (musician) (1932–2006), British jazz trumpeter
 Ian Hamer (athlete) (born 1965), British long-distance runner
 Jan Hamer (1927–2008), Dutch organic chemist active in the U.S.
 Jean Jérôme Hamer (1916-1996), Belgian Cardinal
 John Hamer (footballer) (born 1944), English football midfielder
 John C. Hamer (born 1970), American-Canadian historian and mapmaker
 John Hamer (figure skater) (born 1984), English figure skater
 Judith Hamer (born 1990), British wheelchair basketball player
 Julia Hamer-Bevis (born 1971), English professional wrestler known as "Sweet Saraya"
 Marcelle Lively Hamer (1900-1974), American librarian and folklorist
 Mariëtte Hamer (born 1958), Dutch Labour Party politician
 Michelle Hamer (born 1975), Australian visual artist
 Michelle Hamer (author), Australian author and journalist
 Nick Hamer (born 1991), American soccer player 
 Nigel Hamer (born 1949/50), Canadian anglophone Québécois liberation activist
 Paul Hamer, Australian politician
 Philip M. Hamer (1891–1971), American archivist and historian
 Reino Hamer (born 1916), German Major in the Second World War
 Robert Hamer (1911–1963), British film director and screenwriter
 Ru den Hamer (1917–1988), Dutch water polo player
 Rupert Hamer (1916–2004), Australian Liberal Party politician, Premier of Victoria 1972–81
 Rupert Hamer (journalist) (1970–2010), British war correspondent killed in Afghanistan 
 Russell Hamer (born 1940s), Sri Lankan cricketer
 Rusty Hamer (1947–1990), American actor 
 Ryke Geerd Hamer (1935–2017), German physician
 Sam Hield Hamer (1869–1941), English writer
 Steve Hamer (footballer) (born 1951), Welsh football defender and club chairman
 Stu Hamer (born 1934), British jazz trumpeter
 Thomas L. Hamer (1800–1846), United States congressman and soldier  
 Thomas Ray Hamer (1864–1950), United States Representative from Idaho 
 Thomas Hamer (swimmer) (born 1998), British parasport swimmer
 Tor Hamer (born 1983), American boxer

See also
Ralph Hamers (born 1966), Dutch banker, CEO of ING Group
Ralph Hamor (died 1626), English Virginia colonist
Raymond Hamers (born 1930s), Belgian immunologist and biotechnologist
Sebastian Hämer (born 1979), German singer and songwriter

References

Dutch-language surnames
English-language surnames
Occupational surnames